Brian Williams is a Welsh industrial musician, sound designer and film score composer. He is often credited for creating the dark ambient genre with albums recorded under the name Lustmord. His experimental work has been described as "not traditionally 'musical'" with "more clearly visual aspects".

Biography 

Williams was raised in rural Wales, before relocating to London in his late teens. In London, Williams befriended Throbbing Gristle members Cosey Fanni Tutti and Chris Carter, who urged him to make his own music. He started recording as Lustmord in 1980 before joining SPK in 1982. Lustmord has extracted field recordings made in crypts, caves, and slaughterhouses, and combined it with occasional ritualistic incantations and Tibetan horns. His treatments of acoustic phenomena encased in digitally expanded bass rumbles have a dark ambient quality. Some of Lustmord's most notable collaborations include Robert Rich on the critically acclaimed Stalker, Jarboe, John Balance of Coil, Monte Cazazza, Clock DVA, Chris & Cosey, Paul Haslinger, and experimental sludge group Melvins on Pigs of the Roman Empire. He worked with Tool again in 2019, providing the ocean and wave sound effects on the track "Descending" on their album Fear Inoculum.

Williams released the album Heresy, considered a milestone of the genre of dark ambient, in 1990.

Williams collaborated with Graeme Revell and Paul Haslinger to contribute as "musical sound designer" and occasionally as an additional composer to 44 Hollywood film soundtracks, most notably on The Crow and Underworld.

Lustmord worked on Tool's DVD singles and remixed versions of "Schism" and "Parabola," which were released on 20 December 2005. Lustmord also contributed to Tool's 2006 album 10,000 Days with the atmospheric storm sounds on the title track, "10,000 Days". He later worked again with Tool vocalist Maynard James Keenan, collaborating on Keenan's project Puscifer debut album "V" is for Vagina, as well as providing several remixes for "V" is for Viagra. The Remixes. Lustmord eventually generated a collection of dub remixes of several tracks from "V" is for Vagina known as "D" Is for Dubby - The Lustmord Dub Mixes. The nine-track LP was released as a digital download on 17 October 2008, available directly from the Puscifer website. He also did some additional music including the track "The Western Approaches" feat. Wes Borland on guitar for the documentary Blood into Wine.

Lustmord released the album [ O T H E R ] on California-based label Hydra Head Records in July 2008. It features guest appearances by Adam Jones, King Buzzo, and Aaron Turner.

Live performances
Lustmord appeared live for the first time in 25 years as part of the high mass observance by the Church of Satan. The ceremony took place on 6 June 2006. A recording of the performance titled Rising was released. Lustmord himself noted that the offer was "one of those things that was just too funny to say 'no' to".

Lustmord performed for the second time in 29 years at Unsound Festival Kraków on 22 October 2010.

Lustmord performed at Art's Birthday celebration (initiated by Robert Filliou) at Södra Teatern in Stockholm, Sweden, on 15 January 2011. He performed at the Unsound Festival in New York for the first time on 9 and 10 April 2011.
Lustmord's first performance in the Netherlands was in September 2011 at the Incubate Festival.

Lustmord played for the first time in Moscow, Russia, on 8 April 2012, at Cinema 35mm. Bad Sector played the first act of the show.

Video games
Around 1999, Lustmord was also involved with the video game Planescape: Torment—his work eventually went unused when the project changed direction. He provided music and sound design for a variety of other projects since, such as Far Cry Instincts, Underworld and NVIDIA demos, many of which include collaborations with Haslinger. He was also involved with the 2003 game Master of Orion. In 2015 he composed the soundtrack for Evolve with Jason Graves., and composed the soundtrack of the horror game Scorn together with Aethek.

Films
Lustmord composed the soundtrack for the 2017 film First Reformed and the 2020 film The Empty Man.

Lustmord had two songs used in the TV show Vikings: Valhalla seasons I & II; the songs are "Babel" and "Y Gair".

Personal life 

In early 1990s, Williams relocated to California from London with his wife Tracey, who is a fabricator at Legacy Effects. He is an atheist and has noted that while his ominous music gives an impression to some people that he's "somehow dark and [he] live[s] in a castle or in a dungeon", and that he's "very serious about certain aspects of [his] work", he's "not that serious about [himself]".

Discography

See also 
List of ambient music artists

References

External links 
 
 

Dark ambient musicians
British experimental musicians
British industrial musicians
British electronic musicians
Living people
Soleilmoon artists
Welsh keyboardists
Welsh atheists
Welsh expatriates in the United States
British sound designers
British film score composers
British male film score composers
Third Mind Records artists
Audiovisual artists
Year of birth missing (living people)